Five American Portraits  is an album by the experimental rock band Red Krayola and the conceptual art group Art & Language, released in 2010 by Drag City.

Critical reception
The Philadelphia Inquirer wrote that "forty-four years after its start, the Red Krayola is still as ridiculous as it is compelling."

Track listing

Personnel 
Red Krayola
Gina Birch – bass guitar, vocals
Alex Dower – drums, percussion, backing vocals
Jim O'Rourke – bass guitar
Tom Rogerson – piano
Mayo Thompson – guitar, piano, vocals, mixing
Tom Watson – guitar

Additional musicians and production
Dan Cox – backing vocals, engineering
Butchy Fuego – mixing
Matt Ingram – backing vocals, engineering
Rian Murphy – mixing
Fred Somsen – backing vocals

References

External links 
 

2010 albums
Drag City (record label) albums
Red Krayola albums